This is a list of mayors of Kerkrade, Netherlands.

In 1982 the municipality of Eygelshoven merged into Kerkrade.

Mayors of Dutch municipalities are appointed by the cabinet in the name of the monarch, with advice of the city council.

Mayors of Kerkrade

See also 
 List of mayors of Eygelshoven

External links 
List of mayors of Kerkrade at www.kgv.nl

 1
Kerkrade